Castles Made of Sand may refer to:

Sand castles, see Sand art and play
Castles Made of Sand (novel), the novel by Gwyneth Jones
"Castles Made of Sand" (song) a song from the album Axis: Bold as Love by Jimi Hendrix
"Castles Made of Sand" (Magic City), an episode of the American TV series Magic City

See also
"Sandcastles in the Sand," an episode of How I Met Your Mother